Saros cycle series 128 for solar eclipses occurs at the Moon's descending node, repeating every 18 years, 11 days, containing 73 events. All eclipses in this series occurs at the Moon's descending node.

This solar saros is linked to Lunar Saros 121.

Umbral eclipses
Umbral eclipses (annular, total and hybrid) can be further classified as either: 1) Central (two limits), 2) Central (one limit) or 3) Non-Central (one limit). The statistical distribution of these classes in Saros series 128 appears in the following table.

Events

References 
 https://eclipse.gsfc.nasa.gov/SEsaros/SEsaros128.html

External links
Saros cycle 128 - Information and visualization

Solar saros series